Episauris is a monotypic moth genus in the family Geometridae. Its only species, Episauris kiliani, is known from the Canary Islands. Both the genus and species were first described by Rebel in 1898.

References

Trichopterygini